Lousadzak (The Coming of Light), Op. 48, is a 1944 concerto for piano and string orchestra by the American-Armenian composer Alan Hovhaness.  The work is known for its use of aleatory that is said to have impressed fellow composers Lou Harrison and John Cage, and anticipated "many soon-to-be-hip" aleatory techniques.

Reception
Andrew Farach-Colton of Gramophone lauded Lousadzak, saying, "the music has a spare sensuality that’s [...] delectable."  The work was also praised by BBC Music Magazine's Anthony Burton for its "Eastern emphasis on ornamented melody over a drone bass, and its almost complete absence of conventional harmony." On the other hand, John R. White, writing in the mid-1960s before the wider usage of minimalist and aleatoric devices in American art music, singled out the work's aleatory passages as a particular weakness, observing that even though the "delicious humming effect" they produce "may delight an audience that has never before seen an orchestra turned loose on chance music", such basic assumptions mean that "this easily playable work sounds static and after a while simply has to cease on a shimmering sound."

See also
List of compositions by Alan Hovhaness

References

Compositions by Alan Hovhaness
1944 compositions
Piano concertos
20th-century classical music